Johnathan Jauquez Abram (born October 25, 1996) is an American football free safety for the Seattle Seahawks of the National Football League (NFL). He played college football at Mississippi State and Georgia and went to high school at East Marion High School where he played high school football for the East Marion Eagles.

College career
A 2-star recruit, Abram committed to Georgia on November 1, 2014.  Following his freshman season at Georgia, Abram announced that he would be transferring out.  After transferring to Jones County Junior College, Abram received a scholarship from the University of Georgia again, four months after leaving.  On December 16, 2016, Abram announced that he would be playing football at Mississippi State for his final 2 years of college eligibility. He also took snaps at linebacker in high school, so, they considered whether they should move him and take snaps there instead, at Mississippi State.  Following his senior year at Mississippi State where he led the team with 93 tackles, Abram was named to the first-team All-SEC by the media and to the second-team by the coaches.  Abram was also invited to the 2019 Senior Bowl under San Francisco 49ers head coach Kyle Shanahan.

Professional career

Oakland / Las Vegas Raiders
The Oakland Raiders selected Abram in the first round (27th overall) of the 2019 NFL Draft. Abram was selected with the first-round pick acquired from the Dallas Cowboys in the October 2018 Amari Cooper trade.

2019
Abram made his NFL debut in week 1 against the Denver Broncos.  In the game, Abram made 5 tackles in the 24–16 win. 
After the game, it was reported that Abram tore his rotator cuff and labrum and would be out for the remainder of the season. He was placed on injured reserve on September 13, 2019.

2020
Abram made his return from injury in Week 1 against the Carolina Panthers.  During the game, Abram recorded a team high 13 tackles in the 34–30 win. In Week 3 against the New England Patriots, Abram recorded his first career interception off a pass thrown by Cam Newton during the 36–20 loss. In 2020, the USATODAY referred to "Abram’s lack of coverage skills and awareness is starting to become too difficult to ignore."

2021
Abram entered the 2021 season as the Raiders starting strong safety. He was placed on injured reserve on December 25, 2021, after undergoing shoulder surgery. He finished the season with a career-high 116 tackles, which was second on the team, and one interception through 14 starts.

2022
On April 29, 2022, the Raiders announced that they would not pick up the fifth-year option on Abram's contract, making him a free agent in the 2023 offseason. Abram was waived by the Raiders on November 8, 2022.

Green Bay Packers
On November 10, 2022, the Green Bay Packers claimed Abram off waivers. The Packers waived Abram on November 29.

Seattle Seahawks
Abram was claimed off waivers by the Seattle Seahawks on November 30, 2022.

NFL career statistics

Regular season

Postseason

References

External links
Seattle Seahawks bio
Mississippi State Bulldogs bio
Jones County Bobcats bio
Georgia Bulldogs bio

Living people
American football safeties
Mississippi State Bulldogs football players
Jones County Bobcats football players
Georgia Bulldogs football players
1996 births
People from Columbia, Mississippi
Players of American football from Mississippi
Las Vegas Raiders players
Oakland Raiders players
Green Bay Packers players
Seattle Seahawks players